Sport climbing competitions at the 2024 Summer Olympics are scheduled to run from 5 to 10 August at Le Bourget Sport Climbing Venue in Saint-Denis, returning to the program for the second time since the sport's official debut three years earlier in Tokyo 2020. The total number of medal events will double from two in the previous edition, separating the boulder-and-lead tandem from the speed format. Furthermore, Paris 2024 will witness a significant rise in the number of sport climbers competing contrary to Tokyo 2020, expanding the roster size from 40 to 68.

Venue
The sport climbing competition will take place at the Le Bourget Sport Climbing Venue in Le Bourget in the Seine-Saint-Denis suburb of Paris. Along with the aquatic centre in Saint Denis, the climbing venue will serve as one of the two sports facilities to be built specifically for the Games.

Competition format
Since the inclusion of sport climbing in the Olympics for the 2020 Summer Olympics, the International Federation of Sport Climbing (IFSC) has advocated for three separate medal events: bouldering, lead, and speed; however, sport climbing in Tokyo 2020 was limited to a single combined format for each gender. The format, along with the scoring system multiplying a placement from each discipline, drew criticisms from athletes, prompting a significant overlap between the boulder-and-lead tandem and speed climbing specialists.

For Paris 2024, the International Olympic Committee decided to award four medals in two separate disciplines per gender, namely, boulder-and-lead combined and speed.

Speed

Speed climbing will be a standalone event, following the current standard single-elimination format with athletes climbing side-by-side up a 15-metre wall.

Boulder-and-lead combined
At the 2020 Summer Olympics, points are calculated by multiplying each athlete's position in the lead, boulder, and speed, with the athlete who obtains the lowest total winning. With the speed separated from the combined format for Paris 2024, the IFSC has introduced a system that computes the total score from the lead and boulder phases, with the athlete who garners the most points winning.

The proposed scoring format will be distributed as follows:
 An athlete can earn a maximum of 200 points.
 The maximum points for the boulder phase are 100; each of the four problems is worth up to 25.
Athletes earn 5 points for reaching the first zone, 10 for the second, and the full 25 for the top.
A tenth of a point (0.1) is deducted for each faltered attempt to reach the top.
 The maximum points for the lead phase are 100, attained by reaching the top of a route.
An athlete receives points for the final 40 moves of a route. 
Counting from the top, the last 10 moves earn 4 points each, the previous 10 moves earn 3 each, the previous 10 moves earn 2 each, and the previous 10 moves earn 1 point each.
Moves below the final 40 do not collect any points.

This scoring format was first used (with a slightly different point distribution system) in March 2022 at the Sharma Climbing test event in Barcelona, Spain, before becoming internationally available to the sport climbers at two successful meets, the IFSC Climbing European Championships in Munich, Germany (August 2022) and the IFSC Climbing World Cup series in Morioka, Japan (October 2022).

Qualification

A total of 68 quota places (28 for speed and 40 for the boulder-and-lead combined) are available for Paris 2024, an increment of seventy percent from the Tokyo 2020 roster size (40). Each NOC is entitled to enter a maximum of four climbers (two per gender) in two separate formats.

The qualification period commences at the 2023 IFSC Climbing World Championships, scheduled for 1 to 12 August in Bern, Switzerland. There, ten spots will be awarded to the highest-ranked climbers, respecting the two-athlete NOC limit for each gender: the top three medalists for the boulder-and-lead combined, along with the champion and runner-up for the speed climbing. The remainder of the total quota will be attributed to the twenty eligible climbers for the boulder-and-lead combined, and ten for the speed, respectively, at each of the continental qualification tournaments (Africa, the Americas, Asia, Europe, and Oceania) over a three-month-long period (September to December 2023) and at a triad of Olympic Qualifier Series events held between March and June 2024.

As the host country, France reserves a single spot for each gender in all two disciplines. Four more quota places (two per gender) are entitled to the NOCs competing in each category under the Universality rule.

Competition schedule

Medal summary

Medal table

Events

References

 
2024 Summer Olympics events
2024
Sport in Seine-Saint-Denis
2024 in sport climbing